Amata gigas is a moth of the subfamily Arctiinae. It was described by Rothschild in 1910. It is found on Sulawesi.

References

gigas